Manhattan Murder Mystery is a 1993 American black comedy mystery film directed by Woody Allen, which he wrote with Marshall Brickman, and starring Alan Alda, Allen, Anjelica Huston, and Diane Keaton. The film centers on a married couple's investigation of the death of their neighbor's wife.

The film began as an early draft of Annie Hall, which Allen co-wrote with Brickman. Eventually, the script evolved and principal photography took place in 1992, in the titular city. It was released in August 1993 to positive reviews. Keaton was nominated for a Golden Globe Award for Best Actress – Motion Picture Comedy or Musical. This film marked the eighth, and most recent, collaboration between Allen and Keaton.

Plot
Larry Lipton and his wife Carol have a pleasant encounter with their older neighbors, Paul and Lillian House, in the elevator. The next day, Lillian dies of a heart attack, which surprises the Liptons as she appeared healthy. They become suspicious of Paul's cheerfulness after his wife's death. Carol decides to investigate and visits Paul, finding an urn that contradicts his story about Lillian's burial. Larry becomes frustrated with Carol, but she continues to snoop and finds two tickets to Paris and hotel reservations with a woman named Helen Moss.

Carol and Ted, a close friend, track down Helen, an actress, and eavesdrop on her and Paul talking about money. A few days later, Carol spots a woman who looks identical to Lillian on a passing bus. Larry suggests she has a twin, but Ted finds out Lillian has none. Larry and Carol follow her to a hotel and find her dead in the bedroom. When they call the police, they find no trace of the body. However, they find Lillian's body in the emergency exit panel of the elevator. They witness Paul disposing of the body in a melting furnace and hatch a plan with Marcia Fox to bring Paul to justice.

They trick Paul into believing they retrieved Lillian's body and record Helen's voice to harass Paul into giving them $200,000 or risk exposure. Marcia theorizes that the dead body in the apartment is Lillian's wealthy sister, who looked similar to her and had a heart attack while visiting the Houses. They took advantage of the situation by claiming Lillian had died to profit from her will. However, Paul double-crossed Lillian and killed her so he could run away with Helen.

The plan backfires when Paul kidnaps Carol and demands Lillian's body in exchange for her. Larry and Paul fight, and Mrs. Dalton, Paul's loyal assistant, shoots him. Larry rescues Carol, and they call the police. Marcia's theory is proven correct, and they arrange to have dinner together.

Cast

Production
Allen started Manhattan Murder Mystery as an early draft of Annie Hall, but he did not feel that it was substantial enough, and he decided to go in a different direction. He had put off making the film for years because he felt it was too lightweight, "like an airplane book read". Allen decided to revisit the material in the early 1990s. He contacted Marshall Brickman, who co-wrote Annie Hall, and they developed the story further. The role of Carol was originally written for Mia Farrow, but the part was recast when she and Allen ended their relationship and became embroiled in a custody battle over their three children. Allegations in the media claimed that changes were made to the film in what was "definitely a reaction" to Allen's relationship problems, including the casting of Anjelica Huston as "a much younger first time novelist" with whom Allen's character became romantically involved (Huston was 41 during production).

In the fall of 1992, Allen called Diane Keaton and asked her to fill in for Farrow, and she immediately accepted. When asked if he had re-written the script to fit Keaton's talents, Allen said: 

Making the film was a form of escape for Allen because the "past year was so exhausting that I wanted to just indulge myself in something I could relax and enjoy". He also found it very therapeutic working with Keaton again. After getting over her initial panic in her first scene with Alan Alda, Keaton and Allen slipped back into their old rhythm. After she had trouble with that scene, Allen decided to re-shoot it. In the meantime, she worked with her acting coach and did other scenes that went well. According to Allen, Keaton changed the dynamic of the film because he "always look(s) sober and normal compared to Keaton. I turn into the straight man". Huston said that the set was "oddly free of anxiety, introspection and pain", and this was due to Keaton's presence.

The film was shot in the fall of 1992 on the streets of Greenwich Village, the Upper East Side and the Upper West Side. Allen had cinematographer Carlo Di Palma rely on hand-held cameras, "swiveling restlessly from one room to another, or zooming in abruptly for a close look."

Larry and Carol Lipton's apartment is at 200 East 78th Street, between 2nd and 3rd Avenue and between two groups of New York City Designated Landmarks, east of one group of rowhouses and west of another group. Allen staged a climactic shoot-out in a roomful of mirrors that, according to Allen, referenced a similar shoot-out in Orson Welles' film The Lady from Shanghai.

The film marked Allen's second and final film with TriStar Pictures, and it was speculated in the press that this deal was not extended because of the filmmaker's personal problems or that his films were not very profitable. Allen, however, denied these allegations in interviews at the time. Zach Braff, who was 17 years old at the time, appeared in one scene as Nick Lipton, the son of Larry and Carol. Years later, he said: "When I look at that scene now, all I can see is the terror in my eyes.”

Soundtrack

I Happen to Like New York (1930) – Written by Cole Porter – Performed by Bobby Short
The Best Things in Life Are Free (1927) – Music by Ray Henderson – Lyrics by Lew Brown and Buddy G. DeSylva – Performed by Erroll Garner
The Hallway (1944) – Written by Miklós Rózsa
Der fliegende Holländer (The Flying Dutchman)(1843) – Written by Richard Wagner – Performed by Chor der Staatsoper München
Take Five (1959) – Written by Paul Desmond – Performed by The Dave Brubeck Quartet
I'm in the Mood for Love (1935) – Music by Jimmy McHugh – Lyrics by Dorothy Fields – Performed by Erroll Garner
The Big Noise from Winnetka (1938) – Music by Ray Bauduc and Bob Haggart – Lyrics by Gil Rodin and Bob Crosby
Out of Nowhere (1931) – Music by Johnny Green – Lyrics by Edward Heyman – Performed by Coleman Hawkins
Have You Met Miss Jones (1937) – Music by Richard Rodgers – Lyrics by Lorenz Hart – Performed by Art Tatum-Ben Webster Quartet
Guy and Dolls: Overture (1951) – Written by Frank Loesser – Performed by the New Broadway Cast (1992)
Sing, Sing, Sing (1936) – Written by Louis Prima – Performed by Benny Goodman and His Orchestra
Misty (1954) – Written and performed by Erroll Garner

Reception

Box office
Manhattan Murder Mystery opened on August 18, 1993, in 268 theaters and made USD $2 million in its opening weekend. It went on to gross $11.3 million in North America, below its estimated $13.5 million budget.  Its £1,920,825 in box office made it the number-one film in the United Kingdom for the weekend ending January 23, 1994.

Critical response
The film was well received by critics and holds a 94% positive "Fresh" rating on the review aggregator Rotten Tomatoes, with 29 positive out of 31 reviews.

In his review for Newsweek, David Ansen wrote, "On screen, Keaton and Allen have always been made for each other: they still strike wonderfully ditsy sparks". USA Today gave the film four out of four stars, and advised fans to forget Allen's tabloid woes because "there's a better reason why Allen fans should give it a shot. It's very, very funny, and there's no mystery about that". Janet Maslin called it a "dated detective story" but also wrote, "it achieves a gentle, nostalgic grace and a hint of un-self-conscious wisdom".  Desson Howe, in The Washington Post, complained that there was "little 'new'" in this film. Allen and Keaton are essentially playing Alvy Singer and Annie Hall gone middle-aged".

Nominations
1994 César Awards: Best Foreign Film
48th British Academy Film Awards: Best Actress in a Supporting Role, Anjelica Huston
51st Golden Globe Awards: Best Performance by an Actress in a Leading Role – Comedy/Musical, Diane Keaton

References

External links
 
 
 
 
 

1993 films
1993 comedy films
1990s black comedy films
1990s comedy mystery films
1990s crime comedy films
American black comedy films
American comedy mystery films
American crime comedy films
Films directed by Woody Allen
Films produced by Robert Greenhut
Films set in Manhattan
Films shot in New York City
Films with screenplays by Marshall Brickman
Films with screenplays by Woody Allen
TriStar Pictures films
Uxoricide in fiction
Films about sisters
1990s English-language films
1990s American films